The School of Leadership and Professional Advancement (SLPA) at Duquesne University offers a number of academic programs for adult students. The school has flexible scheduling, program choices, and student services. Courses are offered in Pittsburgh, and online as well as at Fort Indiantown Gap and the 171st Airlift Wing. SLPA provides special tuition rates for eligible service members and veterans.

Program
The school offers a Master of Science in Leadership degree; students can pursue an optional concentration in Global Leadership, Sports Leadership, Community Leadership, Information Technology, Business Ethics, Professional Administration, or Liberal Studies. The school also offers an accelerated bachelor's degree program with a number of concentration areas including training and development, organizational leadership, behavioral science, and criminal justice and forensic science.

Administration
The dean of the school is Dorothy Bassett, Ph.D.

References

External links
School of Leadership and Professional Advancement

School School of Leadership